Tarbes Gespe Bigorre (often called Tarbes GB or TGB) is a French women's basketball club, taking part to the professional French league for women, the LFB, and to European Cups (now EuroLeague Women).
It is the most important club sport in the town of Tarbes, a 60,000 inhabitants town in the southwest part of France.

Prize winners
 1 Ronchetti Cup: 1996 (Runner-up in 2002)
 1 French championship: 2010 (Runner-up in 1993, 1995, 2003, 2018)
 3 French Cups: 1996, 1997, 1998 (Runner-up in 2009, 2010)
 1 Tournoi de la Fédération: 1995 (Runner-up in 1996, 1997)

Players and coaches

2006-2007 roster

Head Coach: Pascal Pisan  
Assistant: Xavier Noguera
Assistant: Krassimira Banova

Season 2005-2006
  Katryna Gaither

Famous players

Successive coaches
  Jean-Pierre Siutat
  Damien Leyrolles
  Igor Grudin
  José Ruiz
  Pascal Pisan
  Patrick Maucouvert
  François Gomez

External links
Official website
TGBÉLITE - Unofficial website

Women's basketball teams in France
EuroLeague Women clubs
Basketball teams established in 1983
Sport in Hautes-Pyrénées